Tara is a genus of Australian jumping spiders that was first described by George and Elizabeth Peckham in 1886.  it contains only three species, found only in New South Wales: T. anomala, T. gratiosa, and T. parvula.

See also
 Thianitara

References

Salticidae genera
Salticidae
Spiders of Australia